The anima mundi (Greek:) or world soul is, according to several systems of thought, an intrinsic connection between all living beings, which relates to the world in much the same way as the soul is connected to the human body.

Although the concept of the anima mundi originated in classical antiquity, similar ideas can be found in the thoughts of later European philosophers such as those of Baruch Spinoza, Gottfried Leibniz, Immanuel Kant, Friedrich Schelling, and Georg W.F. Hegel (particularly in his concept of Weltgeist).

History

Platonism 

Plato adhered to this idea, identifying the universe as a living being:

Plato's Timaeus describes this living cosmos as being built by the demiurge constructed as to be self-identical and intelligible to reason, according to a rational pattern expressed in mathematical principles and Pythagorean ratios describing the structure of the cosmos, and particularly the motions of the seven classical planets.

Following Plato, the anima mundi became an important component in Neoplatonic cosmology, often including its close relationship to the demiurge and the seven planets.

Stoicism 

The Stoics believed it to be the only vital force in the universe.

Gnosticism 

The anima mundi was borrowed from Platonist philosophy into several Gnostic sects.

Manichaeism 
In Manichaeism, the anima mundi was also called the Light Soul and the Living Soul, contrasting it with matter, which was associated with lifelessness and death and within which the anima mundi was imprisoned. The anima mundi was personified as the Suffering Jesus who, like the historical Jesus, was depicted as being crucified in the world. This mystica cruxificio was present in all parts of the world, including the skies, soil, and trees, as expressed in the Coptic Manichaean psalms.

Mandaeism 

In Mandaeism, the anima mundi has various parallels with mana.

Hermeticism 
The concept of the anima mundi is present in the works of hermetic philosophers like Paracelsus and Robert Fludd.

Judaism 

Rabbi Nachman of Breslov states that this sublime wisdom may be apprehended by a perfect tzaddik (righteous man). Thus, the tzaddik attains cosmic consciousness and thus is empowered to mitigate all division and conflict within creation.

Parallels in eastern philosophy 
Similar concepts in eastern philosophy include the brahman, purusha, and paramatman of Hinduism, and qi in the Chinese School of Naturalists, Taoism, and Neo-Confucianism.

See also

Further reading

References

Bibliography

External links 
 

Concepts in ancient Greek metaphysics
Concepts in ancient Greek philosophy of mind
Latin philosophical phrases
Platonism
Gnosticism
Hermeticism
Spirituality
Jewish mysticism
Christian mysticism